Mehliana: Taming the Dragon is an album by Brad Mehldau and Mark Guiliana released on the Nonesuch label in 2014. Mehldau's solo on "Sleeping Giant" was nominated for Best Improvised Jazz Solo in the 2015 Grammy Awards.

Reception
John Fordham of The Guardian noted, "Mehldau mostly plays old-school synths and Fender Rhodes keys, spinning melodic fragments into distant spaces to be replaced by grouchy low-end hooks and snare patterns, striking chirping treble melodies over chanting children's voices, planting steady, pop-song chord figures under acoustic themes laced with catlike whines...  Guiliana balances drum-machine remorselessness with dazzling improv receptivity." Thom Jurek of AllMusic commented, "This wild melange of keyboards, beats, textures, musical styles, samples, and electronic sounds reflects jagged yet accessible compositions and improvisations whose sonics are as important as their melodies." Cormak Larkin of The Irish Times added "Even by Mehldau’s own standards, Mehliana: Taming the Dragon is a bold move, and one that may surprise, even alarm devoted followers of his acoustic playing. Teaming up with trail-blazing percussionist Mark Guiliana, Mehldau lays his talented hands on an array of electric keyboards, including the gorgeous Fender Rhodes, a prepared upright piano, and a winking bank of old-school 1970s synths. Rarely do both hands play the same keyboard at any given moment. And rarely has new music sounded so damned exciting."

Track listing 
Tracks 1, 6–8, 10, 11 composed by Brad Mehldau; all other tracks composed by Brad Mehldau and Mark Guiliana

 "Taming the Dragon" - 6:42 
 "Luxe" - 5:40  
 "You Can't Go Back Now" - 5:45  
 "The Dreamer"  - 5:24  
 "Elegy for Amelia E." - 7:34  
 "Sleeping Giant" - 6:17
 "Hungry Ghost" - 5:01
 "Gainsbourg" - 7:52
 "Just Call Me Nige" - 5:41
 "Sassyassed Sassafrass" - 5:52 
 "Swimming" - 4:58
 "London Gloaming" - 4:57

Personnel 
Brad Mehldau - Synthesizer, Fender Rhodes, Piano, Spoken Voice, “ahh” vocals 
Mark Guiliana - Drums, Electronics

References 

Nonesuch Records albums
Brad Mehldau albums
2014 albums